Gary Kershaw was a NASCAR driver from Victoria, British Columbia, Canada.

Career

1968
Kershaw was the 1968 stock car champion at Western Speedway in Victoria. He moved up to the Super Stock division in 1969, and won the 1969 track championship.

1981
Kershaw made his NASCAR debut at Riverside International Raceway competing in a NASCAR West Series combined event with NASCAR Winston Cup Series, so he was the best West series driver at the end of the race, however he is credited with a 12th-place finish in both series. He also competed in West Series following event at Phoenix and finished 17th.

1982
Kershaw returned to NASCAR West Series and ran 4 races, in all of them he finished in the Top 10, with a best finish of 7th (twice).

See also
 List of Canadians in NASCAR

References

External links
 

1937 births
Racing drivers from British Columbia
Canadian racing drivers
NASCAR drivers
Sportspeople from Victoria, British Columbia
Living people